"On My Own" is a song recorded by Canadian rock group Hedley. It was released on July 18, 2005 as the lead single from their debut album Hedley. It reached number one on the Canadian Singles Chart. The video for "On My Own" reached number one on the MuchMusic countdown for the week of December 2, 2005. It was also the only single released in the United States from that album. "On My Own" is also featured on the US version of Famous Last Words, which is called Never Too Late.

Background
The song is about a new life and a new beginning. "On My Own" was nominated for the 2006 MuchMusic Video Awards in the category for "Best Rock Video" but lost to Nickelback, Photograph. The song was used in the video game, Thrillville.

Music video
The music video for "On My Own" premiered on MuchMusic on August 2, 2005. It was directed by Sean Michael Turrell.

Track listing

Charts

Release history

See also
List of number-one singles of 2005 (Canada)

References

2005 songs
Hedley (band) songs
Canadian Singles Chart number-one singles
Songs written by Jacob Hoggard
2005 debut singles
Universal Music Group singles